Parque Palermo is a multi-use stadium in Montevideo, Uruguay.  It is currently used primarily for football matches and is the home stadium of Central Español.  The stadium holds 6,500 spectators. Parque Palermo is located within Parque Batlle, close to the Estadio Centenario and the Parque Luis Méndez Piana.

References

Multi-purpose stadiums in Uruguay
Football venues in Montevideo
Central Español